Battle of Falmouth may refer to:

 Battle of Falmouth (1690)
 Battle of Falmouth (1703)